Jo Wilson may refer to:

 Jo Wilson, a fictional character from the television series Grey's Anatomy
 Jo Wilson (presenter), Scottish television presenter
 Jo Wilson (footballer)